Juan José Medina was President of the Provisional Junta of Paraguay from 22 January 1841 to 9 February 1841.

References

Presidents of Paraguay
Year of death missing
Year of birth missing
19th-century Paraguayan people